The Ossetians are an Iranian ethnic group who are indigenous to Ossetia, a region situated across the northern and southern sides of the Caucasus Mountains. They natively speak Ossetic, an Eastern Iranian language of the Indo-European language family, with most also being fluent in Russian as a second language.

Currently, the Ossetian homeland of Ossetia is politically divided between North Ossetia–Alania in Russia, and the de facto country of South Ossetia (recognized by the United Nations as Russian-occupied territory that is de jure part of Georgia). Their closest historical and linguistic relatives, the Jász people, live in the Jászság region within the northwestern part of the Jász-Nagykun-Szolnok County of Hungary. A third group descended from the medieval Alans are the Asud of Mongolia. Both the Jász and the Asud have long been assimilated; only the Ossetians have preserved a form of the Alanic language and Alanian identity.

The majority of Ossetians are Eastern Orthodox Christians, with sizable minorities professing the Ossetian ethnic religion of Uatsdin as well as Islam.

Etymology
The Ossetians and Ossetia received their name from the Russians, who had adopted the Georgian designations Osi (ოსი, pl. Osebi, ოსები) and Oseti ('the land of Osi', ოსეთი), used since the Middle Ages for the single Iranian-speaking population of the Central Caucasus and probably based on an old Alan self-designation As. Since Ossetian speakers lacked any single inclusive name for themselves in their native language beyond the traditional Iron–Digoron subdivision, these terms came to be accepted by the Ossetians as an endonym already before their integration into the Russian Empire.

This practice was put into question by the new Ossetian nationalism in the early 1990s, when the dispute between the Ossetian subgroups of Digoron and Iron over the status of the Digor dialect made Ossetian intellectuals search for a new inclusive ethnic name. This, combined with the effects of the Georgian–Ossetian conflict, led to the popularization of Alania, the name of the medieval Sarmatian confederation, to which the Ossetians traced their origin and to the inclusion of this name into the official republican title of North Ossetia in 1994.

The root os/as- probably stems from an earlier *ows/aws-, whose meaning is unknown. This is suggested by the archaic Georgian root ovs- (cf. Ovsi, Ovseti), documented in the Georgian Chronicles; the long length of the initial vowel or the gemination of the consonant s in some forms (NPers. Ās, Āṣ; Lat. Aas, Assi); and by the Armenian ethnic name *Awsowrk (Ōsur-), referring to an Alan tribe dwelling near modern Georgia by the time of Anania Shirakatsi (7th century AD).

SubgroupsIron in the east and south form a larger group of Ossetians. They speak Iron dialect. Irons are divided into several subgroups: Alagirs, Kurtats, Tagaurs, Kudar, Tual, Urstual and Chsan.Kudar are the southern group of Ossetians.Tual are in the central part of Ossetia (see also Dvals).Chsan are in the east of South Ossetia.Digoron in the west. Digors live in Digora district, Iraf district and some settlements in Kabardino-Balkaria and Mozdok district. They speak Digor dialect.Iasi''', who settled in the Jászság region in Hungary during the 13th century. They spoke the extinct Jassic dialect.

Culture

Mythology

The native beliefs of the Ossetian people are rooted in their Sarmatian origin, which have been syncretized with a local variant of Folk Orthodoxy, in which some pagan gods having been converted into Christian saints. The Narts, the Daredzant, and the Tsartsiat, serve as the basic literature of folk mythology in the region.

Music

 Genres 
Ossetian folk songs are divided into 10 unique genres:

 Historic songs
 War songs
 Heroic songs
 Work songs
 Wedding songs
 Drinking songs
 Humorous songs
 Dance songs
 Romantic songs
 Lyrical songs

 Instruments 
Ossetians use the following Instruments in their music:

 String Instruments:
 Plucked strings:
 Dyuuadæstænon - a twelve-stringed Harp
 Fændyr - an Harp with two or three plucked strings
 Bowed strings
 Hysyn - two or three string Fiddle
 Hyyrnæg - is a double-bridged instrument, a kind of Cello

 Wind instruments
 Uadyndz - Flute
 Khyozyn - Reed Flute
 Lalym - Bagpipes
 Udaevdz - Double-reeds
 Fidiuæg - some kind of instrument made from a bull's horn

 Percussion instruments
 Kartsgænæg - Rattles
 Gymsæg - Drum
 Dala - Tambourine

History

Pre-history (Early Alans)

The Ossetians descend from the Iazyges tribe of the Alans, a Sarmatian sub-tribe, which in turn is a Scythian subgroup itself. The Alans were the only branch of the Sarmatians to keep their culture in the face of a Gothic invasion (c. 200 AD) and those who remained built a great kingdom between the Don and Volga Rivers, according to Coon, The Races of Europe. Between 350 and 374 AD, the Huns destroyed the Alan kingdom and the Alan people were split in half. A few fled to the west, where they participated in the Barbarian Invasions of Rome, established short-lived kingdoms in Spain and North Africa and settled in many other places such as Orléans, France, Iași, Romania, Alenquer, Portugal and Jászberény, Hungary. The other Alans fled to the south and settled in the Caucasus, where they established their medieval kingdom of Alania.

Middle Ages

In the 8th century a consolidated Alan kingdom, referred to in sources of the period as Alania, emerged in the northern Caucasus Mountains, roughly in the location of the latter-day Circassia and the modern North Ossetia–Alania. At its height, Alania was a centralized monarchy with a strong military force and had a strong economy that benefited from the Silk Road.

After the Mongol invasions of the 1200s, the Alans migrated further into Caucasus Mountains, where they would form three ethnographical groups; the Iron, the Digoron and the Kudar. The Jassic people are believed to be a potentially fourth group that migrated in the 13th century to Hungary.

Modern history

In more-recent history, the Ossetians participated in the Ossetian–Ingush conflict (1991–1992) and Georgian–Ossetian conflicts (1918–1920, early 1990s) and in the 2008 South Ossetia war between Georgia and Russia.

Key events:
1774 — Expansion of the Russian Empire on Ossetian territory.
1801 — After Russian annexation of the east Georgian kingdom of Kartli-Kakheti, the modern-day territory of South Ossetia becomes part of the Russian Empire.
1922 — Creation of the South Ossetian autonomous oblast. North Ossetia remains a part of the Russian SFSR, while South Ossetia remains a part of the Georgian SSR.
20 September 1990 – The independent Republic of South Ossetia is formed. Though it remained unrecognized,  it detached itself from Georgia de facto. In the last years of the Soviet Union, ethnic tensions between Ossetians and Georgians in Georgia's former Autonomous Oblast of South Ossetia (abolished in 1990) and between Ossetians and Ingush in North Ossetia evolved into violent clashes that left several hundred dead and wounded and created a large tide of refugees on both sides of the border. 

Ever since de facto independence, there have been proposals in South Ossetia of joining Russia and uniting with North Ossetia.

Language

The Ossetian language belongs to the Eastern Iranian (Alanic) branch of the Indo-European language family.

Ossetian is divided into two main dialect groups: Ironian (os. – Ирон) in North and South Ossetia and Digorian (os. – Дыгурон) in Western North Ossetia. In these two groups are some subdialects, such as Tualian, Alagirian and Ksanian. The Ironian dialect is the most widely spoken.

Ossetian is among the remnants of the Scytho-Sarmatian dialect group, which was once spoken across the Pontic–Caspian Steppe. The Ossetian language is not mutually intelligible with any other Iranian language.

Religion

Prior to the 10th century, Ossetians were strictly pagan, though they were partially Christianized by Byzantine missionaries in the beginning of the 10th century. By the 13th, gradually most of the urban population of Ossetia became Eastern Orthodox Christian as a result of Georgian missionary work.James Stuart Olson, Nicholas Charles Pappas. An Ethnohistorical dictionary of the Russian and Soviet empires. Greenwood Publishing Group, 1994. p 522.

Islam was introduced shortly after during the 1500s and 1600s, when the members of the Digor first encountered Circassians of the Kabarday tribe in Western Ossetia, who themselves had been introduced to the religion by Tatars during the 1400s.

According to a 2013 estimate, up to 15% of North Ossetia’s population practice Islam.

In 1774, Ossetia became part of the Russian Empire, which only went on to strengthen Orthodox Christianity considerably, by having sent Russian Orthodox missionaries there. However, most of the missionaries chosen were churchmen from Eastern Orthodox communities living in Georgia, including Armenians and Greeks, as well as ethnic Georgians. Russian missionaries themselves were not sent, as this would have been regarded by the Ossetians as too intrusive.

Today, the majority of Ossetians from both North and South Ossetia follow Eastern Orthodoxy.

Assianism (Uatsdin or Aesdin in Ossetian), the Ossetian folk religion, is also widespread among Ossetians, with ritual traditions like animal sacrifices, holy shrines, annual festivities, etc. There are temples, known as kuvandon, in most villages. According to the research service Sreda'', North Ossetia is the primary center of Ossetian Folk religion and 29% of the population reported practicing the Folk religion in a 2012 survey. Assianism has been steadily rising in popularity since the 1980s.

Economy
The Northern Ossetians export lumber and cultivate various crops, mainly corn. The Southern Ossetians are chiefly pastoral, herding sheep, goats and other cattle. Traditional manufactured products include leather goods, fur headgear, daggers and metalware.

Demographics
Outside of South Ossetia, there are also a significant number of Ossetians living in Trialeti, in North-Central Georgia. A large Ossetian diaspora lives in Turkey and Syria, Ossetians have also settled in Belgium, France, Sweden, the United States (primarily New York City, Florida and California), Canada (Toronto), Australia (Sydney) and other countries all around the world.

Russian Census of 2002
The vast majority of Ossetians live in Russia (according to the Russian Census (2002)):

 North Ossetia–Alania — 445,300
 Moscow — 10,500
 Kabardino-Balkaria — 9,800
 Stavropol Krai — 7,700
 Krasnodar Krai — 4,100
 Karachay–Cherkessia — 3,200
 Saint Petersburg — 2,800
 Rostov Oblast — 2,600
 Moscow Oblast — 2,400

Genetics
The Ossetians are a unique ethnic group of the Caucasus, speaking an Indo-Iranian language surrounded mostly by Vainakh-Dagestani and Abkhazo-Circassian ethnolinguistic groups, as well as Turkic tribes such as the Karachays and the Balkars. 

The Y-haplogroup data indicate that North Ossetians are more similar to other North Caucasian groups, and South Ossetians to other South Caucasian groups, than the two are to each other. With respect to mtDNA, Ossetians are significantly more similar to some Iranian groups than to Caucasian groups. It is thus suggested that there is a common origin of Ossetians from the Proto-Iranian Urheimat, followed by subsequent male-mediated migrations from their Caucasian neighbours.

Gallery

See also

Alans
Asud
Digor (people)
Iazyges
Iron (people)
Jassic people
Alexander Kubalov
Ossetians in Trialeti
Ossetians in Turkey
Peoples of the Caucasus
Sarmatians
Scythians
Terek Cossacks

References

Bibliography

External links
Ossetians.com – a site about famous Ossetians

 
Alans
Ethnic groups in Russia
Ethnic groups in Turkey
Ethnic groups in Syria
Iranian ethnic groups
Iranian peoples in the Caucasus
Peoples of the Caucasus